Rebecca Miller (born 10 August 1995) is an Australian rules footballer playing for the Richmond Football Club in the AFL Women's (AFLW). Miller signed with Richmond during the first period of the 2019 expansion club signing period in July. She made her debut against  at Ikon Park in the opening round of the 2020 season.

Statistics
Statistics are correct to round 3, 2022

|- style="background-color: #eaeaea"
! scope="row" style="text-align:center" | 2020
|style="text-align:center;"|
| 15 || 6 || 0 || 0 || 23 || 17 || 40 || 8 || 9 || 0.0 || 0.0 || 3.8 || 2.8 || 6.7 || 1.3 || 1.5
|- 
| scope="row" style="text-align:center" | 2021
|style="text-align:center;"|
| 15 || 9 || 0 || 0 || 58 || 18 || 76 || 16 || 8 || 0.0 || 0.0 || 6.4 || 2.0 || 8.4 || 1.8 || 0.9
|- style="background:#EAEAEA"
| scope="row" text-align:center | 2022
| 
| 15 || 3 || 0 || 0 || 19 || 12 || 31 || 4 || 5 || 0.0 || 0.0 || 6.3 || 4.0 || 10.3 || 1.3 || 1.7
|- 
|- class="sortbottom"
! colspan=3| Career
! 18
! 0
! 0
! 100
! 47
! 147
! 28
! 22
! 0.0
! 0.0
! 5.6
! 2.6
! 8.2
! 1.6
! 1.2
|}

References

External links 

 

1995 births
Living people
Richmond Football Club (AFLW) players
Australian rules footballers from New South Wales